Celebrity Big Brother 19, also known as Celebrity Big Brother: All-Stars vs. New Stars, was the nineteenth series of the British reality television series Celebrity Big Brother, hosted by Emma Willis  and narrated by Marcus Bentley. The series launched on 3 January 2017 and concluded after 32 days on 3 February 2017, making it the joint longest celebrity series to date along with Celebrity Big Brother 17. The series was shown on Channel 5 in the United Kingdom and 3e in Ireland. Rylan Clark-Neal continues to present the spin-off show Celebrity Big Brother's Bit on the Side. It is the twelfth celebrity series and eighteenth series of Big Brother overall to air on Channel 5.

With eighteen housemates, this series has the most housemates since the show began in 2001. It also marks the only celebrity series to have housemates returning to represent previous series, and is the first to include two sets of late entrants. As well as this, it also included the voluntary exits of Brandon Block and Ray J.

On 3 February 2017, the series was won by Coleen Nolan having received 32.65% of the final vote, with Jedward finishing as the runners-up with 29.91% of the final vote. Kim Woodburn was the highest placed "New star" finishing in third place with 14.52% of the final vote.

Production

Eye logo
On 5 December 2016, Willis released the new official eye logo for the series featuring a pop-art themed, comic style teaser with "Pop goes January" as the slogan.

Teasers
On 17 December 2016, the official 30 second trailer was released with Willis and Clark-Neal.
From 20 December, the new housemates were teased on the official Facebook page, the official Twitter and on the Big Brother app.

House
Pictures of the new house were revealed on 29 December 2016 by Clark-Neal and the official app. It is heavily inspired by pop art.

Housemates
Ahead of the series, it was announced that some ex-housemates would return to compete against some new celebrity housemates. Fourteen housemates entered the house on Day 1 including seven "All stars" and seven "New stars". A further "All star", Jedward entered the house on Day 4. Then on Day 11, a further three "New stars", Chloe, Jessica and Kim entered on Day 11.

Angie Best
Angie Best is an English model and former Playboy Bunny, known as the first wife of footballer George Best. Together they had one son, Calum Best who is also a housemate. She fitness coached and trained celebrity clients, including pop star Cher and actresses Sharon Stone and Daryl Hannah and wrote her autobiography George and Me: My Autobiography in 2002. She entered the house on Day 1 as a "new star". She became the first housemate to be evicted on Day 11.

Austin Armacost
Austin Armacost is an American reality television personality and model, who is best known for his role in The A-List: New York, as well as dating fashion designer Marc Jacobs. He entered the house as an "All star" on Day 1 having previously competed in Celebrity Big Brother 16, finishing runner-up behind James Hill. He became the second housemate to be evicted on Day 11 following a twist. Austin made a brief return on Day 26 for a "Final Judgement" task.

Bianca Gascoigne
Bianca Gascoigne is a British glamour model and television personality. Gascoigne has appeared  in Loaded, Nuts and FHM. In 2006, Gascoigne won ITV's reality TV show Love Island with fellow housemate Calum Best and in 2010, she took part in Celebrity Coach Trip with her friend and Big Brother contestant Imogen Thomas. She is the daughter of Sheryl Gascoigne, and former stepdaughter of Paul Gascoigne, an ex-footballer. She entered the house as a "new star" on Day 1. She left on Day 32 finishing in sixth place.

Brandon Block
Brandon Block is a British DJ. He has held residencies at Up Yer Ronson in Leeds, FUBAR at the Milk Bar in London, Club For Life in London, and Scream in Plymouth. He has also played numerous other venues such as the Ministry of Sound. Muzik magazine awarded Block the "Caner of the Year" prize three times. He had three singles released under his Blockster alias – "Something Goin' On", "Grooveline" and "You Should Be.." –, all of which were released by Ministry of Sound. Block is also well known for appearing on stage heavily intoxicated at the 2000 Brit Awards, as well as starring on Trust Me - I'm A Holiday Rep, The Weakest Link and Come Dine with Me. He entered the house as a "new star" on Day 1. On Day 9, Brandon walked from the house.

Calum Best
Calum Best is a British-American former fashion model, television personality, and occasional actor. He is also known as the son of the late football icon, George Best and former Playboy model and fellow housemate Angie Best. He won the second series of Celebrity Love Island in 2006, and appeared in the ITV2 series Calum, Fran and Dangerous Danan, with Fran Cosgrave and Paul Danan. He was also featured in the MTV show Totally Calum Best, where it detailed Best's attempts to remain celibate for fifty days. He entered the house on Day 1 as an "All star" having previously competed in Celebrity Big Brother 15 finishing in third place behind Katie Price and Katie Hopkins. He was the tenth housemate to be evicted on Day 29.

Chloe Ferry
Chloe Ferry is a British reality television personality, best known as a cast member in the MTV reality series, Geordie Shore from series 10 onwards. She entered the house on Day 11 as a "New star" as part of the 'Weekend from Hell' twist. She became the fifth housemate to be evicted on Day 18.

Coleen Nolan
Coleen Nolan is an English television presenter, author, singer, and the youngest member of the girl group The Nolans. Nolan has since been a panellist on Loose Women and a contestant on Dancing on Ice. She entered the house on Day 1 as an "All star" after competing in Celebrity Big Brother 10 and coming runner-up to Julian Clary. She left the house on Day 32 as the winner.

Heidi Montag & Spencer Pratt
Heidi Montag and Spencer Pratt, know collectively as Speidi, are an American reality television couple best known for starring in the MTV reality series The Hills from 2006 to 2010. They participated on the second American series of I'm a Celebrity...Get Me Out of Here! (with former housemates Stephen Baldwin, Daniel Baldwin and Janice Dickinson). They entered the house as "All stars" on Day 1 having previously competed in Celebrity Big Brother 11, finishing as runners-up behind Rylan Clark. On Day 18, they were chosen to receive eternal nomination, meaning they were to face all evictions for the remainder of the series. They became the eighth housemates to be evicted on Day 25 in a double eviction.

James Cosmo
James Cosmo is a Scottish actor known for his appearances in films including Highlander, Braveheart, Trainspotting, Troy and The Chronicles of Narnia: The Lion, the Witch and the Wardrobe, as well as television series such as Game of Thrones. He entered the house on Day 1, competing as a "new star". On Day 18, he received the most votes from his fellow housemates to receive immunity for the remainder of the series. He left the house on Day 32 finishing fourth.

James Jordan
James Jordan is an English ballroom dancer and choreographer, who had competed as one of the male professional partners on Strictly Come Dancing, from 2006 to 2013. In 2019, he won the eleventh series of Dancing On Ice. He entered the house as an "All star" on Day 1 having previously competed in Celebrity Big Brother 14, finishing in third place behind Gary Busey and Audley Harrison. He became the fourth housemate to be evicted on Day 15.

Jamie O'Hara
Jamie O'Hara is an English professional footballer. O'Hara came through Arsenal F.C. Academy to then sign for Tottenham Hotspur to become a first-team player during the 2007–08 season. He has had several loan spells, including a stint at Portsmouth that saw them reach the 2010 FA Cup Final. He was formerly married to former Miss England model and Celebrity Big Brother 5 housemate Danielle Lloyd. He entered the house on Day 1 as a "new star". He became the ninth housemate to be evicted on Day 27 through the back door following a twist during "The Final Judgement".

Jasmine Waltz
Jasmine Waltz is an American model and actress, who had minor roles in films and television shows such as Femme Fatales and Secret Girlfriend. She entered the house on Day 1 as an "All star" having competed in Celebrity Big Brother 13 and becoming the second to be evicted. She became the third housemate to be evicted on Day 13 following a twist in the task 'Weekend of Hell'.

Jedward
John and Edward Grimes, known professionally as Jedward, are an Irish identical twin singing duo who rose to fame appearing as finalists on the sixth series on The X Factor. They also competed as Ireland's participation in the Eurovision Song Contest 2011 and 2012. They entered the house on Day 4 as "All stars" having previously competed in Celebrity Big Brother 8, finishing in third place behind Paddy Doherty and Kerry Katona. They left the house on Day 32 as the runners-up.

Jessica Cunningham
Jessica Cunningham is an English businesswoman, actress, model and media personality who appeared on the twelfth series of The Apprentice in 2016, making it to the semi-finals before being fired. She entered the house on Day 11 as a "New star" as part of the 'Weekend from Hell' twist. She became the seventh housemate to be evicted on Day 25.

Kim Woodburn
Kim Woodburn is a British television presenter and expert cleaner. She is best known for her television programme How Clean Is Your House? alongside Aggie MacKenzie. She finished as runner-up on the ninth series of I'm a Celebrity...Get Me Out of Here! (with former housemates Katie Price and Samantha Fox). Kim briefly entered the Big Brother 12 house in 2011 to take part in a cleaning task. She entered the house on Day 11 as a "New star" as part of the 'Weekend from Hell' twist. She left the house on Day 32 in third place.

Nicola McLean
Nicola McLean is an English glamour model and media personality. She finished in sixth place on the eighth series of I'm a Celebrity...Get Me Out of Here!. She entered on Day 1 as an "All Star" having previously competed in Celebrity Big Brother 9 and becoming the sixth to be evicted. She left the house on Day 32 finishing in fifth place.

Ray J
William Ray Norwood Jr. known by his stage name Ray J, is an American singer, songwriter, television personality and actor, who has had two top 20 singles in the UK ("Another Day in Paradise" - a duet with his sister Brandy - and "One Wish"). He is the first cousin of rapper Snoop Dogg. In February 2007, a pornographic home video he made with his then-girlfriend Kim Kardashian in 2003 was made public. He entered the house as a "new star" on Day 1. On Day 8, Ray J walked from the house.

Stacy Francis
Stacy Francis is an American singer and actress, best known for being a part of the girl group Ex Girlfriend and as a contestant in the first season of The X Factor USA. Francis was also a cast member on reality series R&B Divas: Los Angeles and had a well publicised argument with singer Whitney Houston two days before her death over fellow housemate Ray J. On Day 1 she entered the house to compete as a "new star" where she became the first housemate to be "edited out" of the show during the launch night twist. She became the sixth housemate to be evicted on Day 22.

Summary

Nominations table

Notes

Ratings
Official ratings are taken from BARB.

References

External links
 Official website 
 

2017 British television seasons
19